The 2013–14 GNF 2 is the 52nd season of Botola 2 (the 2nd tier football league in Morocco). This season started on 21 September 2013 and ended on 28 May 2014.
On 3 May 2014, Ittihad Khemisset secure their promotion after draw 1-1 in their home match while Chabab Atlas Khenifra also secure their promotion for first time after their 1-0 victory against Racing Athletique Casablanca in the same time, left them 7 points away from remain in GNF 2 with only 2 games left. Ittihad Khemisset clinched their first title after defeat 2-0 in their home match in 30th week while in the same time Chabab Atlas Khenifra goalless draw against Ittihad Tanger.

On 18 May 2014, USM Oujda was relegated after draw 1-1 against CODM Meknes in their away match. Rachad Bernoussi also relegated to GNFA 1 (3rd tier) after draw 1-1 against Chabab Houara in their away match on 24 May 2014 while in the same time USM Ait Melloul defeat CA Youssoufia Berrechid in their away match with score 2-0.

Promotion and relegation
Teams promoted from 2012-13 GNFA 1
 Chabab Club Houara
 Chabab Atlas Khenifra

Teams relegated from 2012–13 Botola
 CODM Meknes
 Raja Beni Mellal

League standings

Morocco
1